WellNow Urgent Care, formerly Five Star Urgent Care, is a conglomerate of walk-in urgent care clinics that serve as alternatives to emergency rooms across Upstate New York. The addition of locations in Cicero, Fairmount and Fayetteville made it the largest urgent care provider in Central New York. Services provided by WellNow Urgent Care include treatment for non-life-threatening illnesses and injuries.

Unlike most urgent care and medical practices, WellNow employs very few Physicians or Registered Nurses, opting for their practices to be mid-level-driven- by Physician Assistants, Medical Assistants, and LPNs being utilized as clinical staff instead.

History
WellNow Urgent Care was founded in Big Flats, New York in 2012 as "Five Star Urgent Care" by Dr. John Radford, a former emergency room physician.  In 2014, WellNow Urgent Care expanded to six locations. That same year the company began offering patients the ability to view wait times for its facilities on its website. 

In 2016, the company opened another location in Liverpool, New York. The Liverpool location differs from the other locations because it offers specialized pediatric urgent care in addition to the normal urgent care services. In 2017, WellNow Urgent Care opened one more location in Vestal, New York. In 2018, the company rebranded as WellNow Urgent Care.

In 2022, WellNow relocated its headquarters to Chicago, Illinois, this was the result of further expansion.

Locations
WellNow Urgent Care primarily serves Central and Western New York, with locations in the following communities: Big Flats (serving Big Flats, Elmira, Corning, Horseheads and Painted Post); Cicero (serving Cicero, Liverpool and North Syracuse); Fairmount (serving Camillus, Fairmount and West Syracuse); Fayetteville (serving Fayetteville, DeWitt, Manlius, Chittenango and East Syracuse); Ithaca (serving Ithaca, Lansing, Dryden, Newfield, Trumansburg, Spencer and Slaterville); Jamestown (serving Jamestown, Salamanca and Warren, Pennsylvania) and Vestal (serving Vestal, Binghamton and Endicott). WellNow also has locations across Michigan (serving the Grand Rapids, Kalamazoo, Benton Harbor, Lansing, Jackson, Detroit, Cadillac, and Alpena areas), Ohio (serving the Cincinnati, Dayton, Columbus, Cleveland, Akron, and Youngstown areas), central Indiana (serving Kokomo, Lafayette, Muncie, Anderson, Indianapolis, and Bloomington), and Illinois (serving Chicago, Crestwood, Melrose Park, Decatur, Collinsville, O’Fallon, and Swansea).

References

Health care companies based in New York (state)
Emergency medical services in the United States
Health care companies established in 2012
American companies established in 2012
2012 establishments in New York (state)

External links 
 Official website